Michael Peter Balzary (born October 16, 1962), known professionally as Flea, is an Australian-American musician and actor. He is a founding member and bassist of the rock band Red Hot Chili Peppers.

Flea was born in Melbourne, Victoria; his family moved to Rye, New York, when he was four. After his parents divorced, Flea spent his childhood in the United States and Australia, before settling in California. At high school, he befriended singer Anthony Kiedis, with whom he formed the Red Hot Chili Peppers in 1983. Flea is also a member of the supergroups Atoms for Peace, Antemasque, Pigface, and Rocket Juice & the Moon, and has played with acts including the Mars Volta, Johnny Cash, Tom Waits, Alanis Morissette, Young MC, Nirvana, What Is This?, Fear, and Jane's Addiction.

Flea incorporates elements of funk (including slap bass), psychedelic, punk, and hard rock in his playing. In 2009, Rolling Stone readers ranked Flea the second-best bassist of all time, behind John Entwistle. In 2012, he and the other members of Red Hot Chili Peppers were inducted into the Rock and Roll Hall of Fame. Since 1984, Flea has acted in films and television series such as Suburbia, Back to the Future Part II and Part III, My Own Private Idaho, The Chase, Fear and Loathing in Las Vegas, Dudes, Son in Law, The Big Lebowski, Low Down, Baby Driver, Boy Erased, The Wild Thornberrys, Obi-Wan Kenobi, and Babylon.

Flea is the co-founder of Silverlake Conservatory of Music, a non-profit organization founded in 2001 for underprivileged children. In 2019, he published a memoir of his early life, Acid for the Children.

Early life
Michael Peter Balzary was born on October 16, 1962, in Melbourne, Victoria, Australia. He is of partial Hungarian and Irish descent. His father, Mick Balzary, an avid fisherman, often took him fishing. When Flea was four, his family moved to Rye, New York, for his father's career. In 1971, his parents divorced, and his father returned to Australia. Flea returned to Australia to spend time with his father, completing three years of school in the national capital Canberra. Flea and his sister Karyn stayed with their mother Patricia, who subsequently married jazz musician Walter Urban (1941–2011).

Flea's stepfather frequently invited musicians to his house for jam sessions. The family moved to Los Angeles, California, where Flea became fascinated by the trumpet. He had no interest in rock music at the time; he idolized jazz musicians like Miles Davis, Louis Armstrong and Dizzy Gillespie. Flea described his childhood home as violent; his stepfather was an aggressive alcoholic who eventually became involved in shoot-outs with police. Flea said: "I grew up being terrified of my parents, particularly my father figures. It caused [me] a lot of trouble later in life." To cope, Flea began smoking cannabis at 13, and became a daily user.

He was first called "Flea" as a teenager for his seeming inability to sit still, and the nickname stuck. Nicknamed Mike B. the Flea, he attended Fairfax High School, and was something of an outcast due to his taste in music. However, he soon met Anthony Kiedis, and after a brief confrontation, the two became best friends. Kiedis recalled: "We were drawn to each other by the forces of mischief and love and we became virtually inseparable. We were both social outcasts. We found each other and it turned out to be the longest-lasting friendship of my life."

Flea was introduced to rock music by Hillel Slovak, and particularly punk rock by Kiedis. Flea learned to play bass from Slovak, who shortly after asked him to be a bassist in his band, Anthym. Flea soon developed his own style and joined the group, but quit several months later in order to play for the punk rock outfit Fear. He then rejoined Slovak to form an intended one-off band: Tony Flow and the Miraculously Majestic Masters of Mayhem along with Kiedis and Jack Irons, all of them at the time inspired by the free funk band Defunkt and the hip hop act Grandmaster Flash and the Furious Five.

Career

Early Red Hot Chili Peppers albums (1984–1987)
The band changed its name to the Red Hot Chili Peppers, playing several shows at L.A. venues. Their repertoire grew to nine songs as a result of months of playing at local nightclubs and bars. The Red Hot Chili Peppers entered Bijou Studios to record a demo tape produced by the then-drummer of Fear and subsequently secured a record deal with EMI. Irons and Slovak, however, decided to leave the Red Hot Chili Peppers in order to pursue a "more serious" future with the rock band What Is This?. Flea ultimately respected the decision, but felt the band would be lost without them. He and Kiedis hired drummer Cliff Martinez and guitarist Jack Sherman to fill Irons' and Slovak's place, respectively. Andy Gill, formerly of Gang of Four, agreed to produce their first album. Gill and Sherman clashed with Flea and Kiedis; they continuously argued over music style, sound, and the album's production. Flea himself felt that the album was stiff and "a big mistake", but also admitted, "we [he and Kiedis] were just disrespectful and obnoxious". The band's eponymous debut album, The Red Hot Chili Peppers, was released on August 10, 1984, to largely poor critical and commercial review. After a relatively unfruitful tour, Sherman was fired in early 1985. Slovak, who had been contemplating a return to the Chili Peppers, rejoined the group after being encouraged by Flea.

Funk musician George Clinton was hired to produce the band's second album, Freaky Styley (1985). The strong chemistry between Clinton and the Chili Peppers was felt instantly. Flea later referred to Clinton as "the warmest, kindest man in the world". Freaky Styley was released in August 1985. It received only a bit more attention than The Red Hot Chili Peppers with roughly 75,000 copies sold by year's end. Flea was somewhat indifferent to the poor album sales as he had recently proposed to girlfriend Loesha Zeviar, who was pregnant with their child. The band hired Michael Beinhorn, their last resort among potential producers, to work on their next album. What Is This? had finally disbanded, and drummer Irons returned to the Chili Peppers in mid-1986 after Martinez was fired. Flea, Slovak and Kiedis especially were involved in heavy drug use and their relationships became strained. Flea recalled that "it began to seem ugly to me and not fun; our communication was not healthy". Kiedis became dependent on heroin, leaving Flea and Slovak to work on much of the album's material by themselves.

Kiedis was briefly kicked out of the band and given a month to rehabilitate. Kiedis completed the rehab and returned with the Red Hot Chili Peppers in Los Angeles to record their third album The Uplift Mofo Party Plan (1987). Flea has referred to the album as "the 'rockingest' record" the band has ever made. The Uplift Mofo Party Plan proved to be far more successful, commercially and critically, than the Chili Peppers' preceding albums, registering at number 148 on the Billboard 200. Following the Uplift tour, Slovak's drug use dramatically increased. Flea's relationship with Slovak faded, and Slovak became isolated and depressed. On June 28, 1988, Slovak was found dead of a heroin overdose. Flea reflected: "I didn't really know how to deal with that sadness, and I don't think [Kiedis] knew how to deal with it either." Irons, who was taking Slovak's death particularly hard, left the group.

Flea and Kiedis took some time to collect themselves, but they kept the band together. Guitarist DeWayne "Blackbyrd" McKnight and drummer D.H. Peligro were added, and the band entered the studio to record a new album. McKnight soon began to create tension within the group, as his style did not mesh with the rest of the band. Peligro, the former drummer of the punk rock band Dead Kennedys, was a friend of John Frusciante, an 18-year-old guitarist and avid Red Hot Chili Peppers fan. Peligro introduced Frusciante to Flea, and the trio jammed together on several occasions. Flea was impressed with Frusciante's skill, and astonished by his knowledge of the Chili Peppers' repertoire. Flea realized that Frusciante could provide the spark McKnight was lacking. McKnight was fired, and Frusciante accepted an invitation to join the band. Peligro was fired shortly thereafter; the Chili Peppers brought in drummer Chad Smith as his replacement.

Mainstream success and side projects (1989–1998)
Flea and his wife Loesha started to grow apart, and he began trying to recreate the memories of his adolescence by smoking marijuana on a daily basis. The Chili Peppers entered the studio, and completed recording of their fourth album, Mother's Milk, in early 1989. Upon release, the album was met with mixed reactions from critics, but received far more commercial attention, peaking at number 52 on the Billboard 200. After this, Flea made appearances playing the trumpet on Jane's Addiction's 1988 album Nothing's Shocking, and bass on the critically acclaimed 1989 Young MC album Stone Cold Rhymin'. He would also appear in the video for "Bust a Move", the hit single from the same album.

The Mother's Milk Tour put further strain on Flea's marriage. In order to make money, he needed to tour, and therefore spent time away from his family. Furthermore, he and Smith were arrested on charges of battery and sexual harassment after a performance on MTV's coverage of spring break; charges were eventually dropped. The band was, however, attracting over three thousand people per show; Mother's Milk had been certified as a gold record in early 1990. By the time Red Hot Chili Peppers returned to Los Angeles, Flea and Loesha agreed to a separation. He tried to put the separation out of his mind by smoking marijuana and having sex with random groupies, when the band was on tour for Mother's Milk.

When the successful Mother's Milk tour was over, the Red Hot Chili Peppers severed ties with EMI and signed instead with Warner Bros. Records. Rick Rubin, who had rejected an opportunity to produce The Uplift Mofo Party Plan, agreed to produce their next album. Flea had largely used the principal slap bass technique on the band's preceding four albums, and decided to downplay this style in favor of more conventional, melodic bass lines. To record the album, Rubin suggested they use a mansion that once belonged to magician Harry Houdini. Flea felt it was "a creatively fertile situation", and decided to bring his daughter Clara with him. He and the rest of the band, excluding Smith, remained inside the house for the entire recording process. When not writing or recording the album, Flea spent a large portion of his time with Frusciante smoking large quantities of marijuana. The emotions Flea felt during the album's recording were like nothing he had ever experienced:

When Blood Sugar Sex Magik was released on September 24, 1991, it received an extremely positive critical response. The album peaked at number three on the Billboard Hot 200, and went on to sell over 7,000,000 copies in the U.S. alone. The album's ensuing tour was critically acclaimed—the Chili Peppers commonly performed shows with over 20,000 in attendance. Seattle-based grunge band Nirvana also toured with them during the West Coast leg of their United States tour. The massive attention the Chili Peppers started receiving, however, caused Frusciante to feel extremely uncomfortable, and he abruptly quit the band during the Japanese leg of the album's tour, replaced temporarily by Arik Marshall.

Following the tour in 1993, Flea was diagnosed with chronic fatigue syndrome and was ordered to rest for a year. Flea and Kiedis felt it best to fire Marshall 

due to lack of chemistry and briefly replaced him with Jesse Tobias, although his tenure was very short and he was quickly replaced by Jane's Addiction guitarist Dave Navarro, who was once recruited in 1992 to replace Frusciante. The band was ready now to record their next album although Kiedis was in the middle of a heroin relapse, which forced Flea to assume the role of lyricist, something he had not yet done. He wrote most of the song "Transcending", and the intro to "Deep Kick". Flea also wrote the entire lyric to a song, "Pea", in which he both played bass and sang. These three songs appeared on the Chili Peppers' sixth record One Hot Minute, which was released on September 12, 1995. The album received mixed reviews and was significantly less commercially successful than Blood Sugar Sex Magik. The One Hot Minute Tour was ultimately cut short due to various injuries Kiedis and Smith received, and the Red Hot Chili Peppers decided to go on hiatus. Flea was so miserable that at one point during the tour he discussed quitting the band. Flea began to practice Transcendental Meditation and yoga, and slowly decreased his marijuana consumption. Due to the Chili Peppers' inactivity, Flea joined Navarro in a Jane's Addiction reunion tour in 1997, filling in for ex-Jane's Addiction bassist Eric Avery. Rumors spread, that the band was breaking up until Navarro stated otherwise: "I want to clarify that the Chili Peppers are not breaking up ... Flea and I are more than happy to do both projects, time permitting."

Flea also had plans to record a solo album. He asked Chili Peppers manager Lindy Goetz to help him promote the record and his future solo career. Flea eventually abandoned the idea in favor of offering his bass services to other artists. He performed on over forty records from 1995 to 1998, ranging from Alanis Morissette's Jagged Little Pill (with Navarro) to former Minutemen bassist Mike Watt's debut solo album Ball-Hog or Tugboat?. He also worked with Tori Amos and Michael Stipe on a track for the soundtrack to the 1995 Johnny Depp film Don Juan DeMarco. Navarro was fired from the Chili Peppers in 1998, and Flea questioned whether or not the Red Hot Chili Peppers would stay together: "... the only way I could imagine carrying on is if we got John [Frusciante] back in the band." Frusciante had completed drug rehabilitation in 1997 after a severe addiction to heroin and crack cocaine left him on the brink of death. Flea visited Frusciante in early 1998, inviting him back to the Chili Peppers; an emotional Frusciante readily accepted.

Californication, By the Way and Stadium Arcadium (1998–2007)
With Frusciante back on guitar, the band began writing new songs during the summer of 1998 in Flea's garage. He and Kiedis were less confident in writing the album after the disappointing results of One Hot Minute. Flea had also recently broken up with his girlfriend of two years, Marissa Pouw, causing him to enter a state of depression which was only lifted when his daughter, Clara, comforted him after several weeks of crying.

Flea was heavily influenced by electronica during the writing and recording of Californication (1999) and he attempted to emulate this when writing bass lines for the album. Californication took less than two weeks to record; by contrast, One Hot Minute took over a year. When Californication was released on June 8, 1999, it received overwhelmingly positive critical reviews and sold fifteen million copies worldwide—more than Blood Sugar Sex Magik. The Chili Peppers played Woodstock 1999, with Flea playing completely naked—something he would do again at the Reading and Leeds Festivals the same year as well as several other Californication tour concerts.

Red Hot Chili Peppers spent most of 2001 writing their eighth studio album, By the Way (2002). The band began listening to more melodic, textured music, that would reflect heavily on the album. Frusciante became the driving force behind By the Way, causing initial strife between him and Flea. If he introduced a funk rhythm into his bass lines Frusciante would consequently disapprove to the point where Flea almost quit the band because he felt his role was no longer important. By the Way was released on July 9, 2002, to positive reviews, and went on to sell over nine million copies worldwide. The ensuing tour was extremely profitable; the Chili Peppers performed three concerts in London's Hyde Park to over 250,000 attendees and a total gross accumulation of US$17.1 million. It became the highest-grossing concert at a single venue in history.

After another two-year world tour, the Chili Peppers wrote their ninth studio album, Stadium Arcadium (2006). Unlike By the Way, both Flea and Frusciante were more musically conjoined, when writing the record. They found inspiration in Jimi Hendrix, Jimmy Page, and Eddie Van Halen among others. The double album was ultimately released on May 9, 2006, to generally positive reviews, selling over seven million copies in less than two years. In November 2007, Flea's $4.8 million Corral Canyon home in Malibu was burnt down by a wildfire. The location was not, however, his primary residence and at the time of its destruction was being rented to musician and producer Butch Walker.

Return to school, Atoms for Peace, and Rocket Juice & the Moon (2008–2011)
After the Chili Peppers announced a long hiatus due to exhaustion, Flea enrolled in music classes at the University of Southern California, where he studied music theory, composition and jazz trumpet. Flea attributed his interest to a newfound desire to widen his appreciation and understanding of music: "It's so much fun to learn this stuff because I never knew anything. I played trumpet in the school bands. I learned things I liked to play on my trumpet but I didn't learn why this note goes with this note and why it produces that sound. Or how to create tension in the composition [...] Knowing the structure is really fun." Flea said he planned to release a mainly instrumental solo record, recorded in his home; guest musicians would include Patti Smith and a choir from the Silverlake Conservatory.

In 2009, Flea joined Atoms for Peace, a supergroup formed by the Radiohead singer Thom Yorke to perform songs from Yorke's debut solo album, The Eraser (2006). Flea and the band recreated Yorke's electronic music with live instrumentation. They toured the United States in 2010, and released an album, Amok, in 2013. Amok was followed that year by a tour of Europe, the US and Japan.

The Chili Peppers ended their hiatus in October 2009 without Frusciante, who quit the band to pursue other musical interests. He was replaced by Josh Klinghoffer. The Red Hot Chili Peppers released their tenth studio album, I'm with You, on August 29, 2011. Also that year, Flea played bass on two songs on Tom Waits' album Bad as Me, released on October 21. On October 27, 2011, it was announced that Flea's project with Damon Albarn and afrobeat drummer Tony Allen would be called Rocket Juice & the Moon. The band made their live debut on October 29, 2011, in London, and released an album on March 12, 2012.

Rock and Roll Hall of Fame induction, Helen Burns, and The Getaway (2012–2017)
The Red Hot Chili Peppers were inducted into the Rock and Roll Hall of Fame in April 2012. Flea commented on the induction by saying, "It's always been easy for me to pooh-pooh these awards—the [Rock] Hall of Fame too. But I inducted Metallica a couple of years ago, and it was really a beautiful thing to see as all these people were being inducted. It made me love it. I love halls of fame anyway—the Basketball Hall of Fame, the Baseball Hall of Fame. So I feel grateful for the recognition of what we have done and for the hope and potential of what we'll continue to do."

On July 19, 2012, Flea released a solo EP, Helen Burns, composed mainly of instrumental tracks, except the title track (which Patti Smith sang on) and "Lovelovelove", which features the Silverlake Conservatory of Music's kids and adults choir. It is Flea's first solo release, who has only released solo songs previously on soundtracks and other projects. Flea said of the EP "I am putting it out to raise money for the Silverlake Conservatory of Music, a community-based non-profit music school that I am an integral part of." The download of the EP is available at "a name your own price" on the Silverlake Conservatory website and was made available through all major digital outlets on August 9, 2012.

On October 16, 2012, his 50th birthday, Flea gave an interview with CNN discussing the Chili Peppers and was asked if he plans to continue with them. Flea responded by saying "I love the Chili Peppers, and I would love to. If there's anything I know, it's every time you start making plans, you don't know what's going to come up next. Anything can happen. So I love being in the Chili Peppers and it's my home, and I've been doing it for more than half my life. Of course, during the course of doing it, there's been all kinds of ups and downs, and moments of extreme (positivity), floating on clouds of greatness, and times of just groveling, and misery, and uncertainty, and anger, and love and all those things. Like being in a family. I really can't predict. But I love being in it for now, and right now, about as far as I'm thinking is getting through this tour that we're doing, performing at the highest level possible, then hunkering down and writing another record."

On April 9, 2014, it was revealed that Flea was working on a new musical project, the band Antemasque, with former Mars Volta members Cedric Bixler-Zavala, Omar Rodríguez-López, and Dave Elitch. Two songs were released in early April though Flea has confirmed that he is not a member of the band and just recorded a few songs with them. Antemasque released their self-titled debut album on July 15, 2014.

Flea occasionally performs a bass rendition of The Star-Spangled Banner before games of the Los Angeles Lakers at the Crypto.com Arena (formerly called Staples Center), in a similar manner as Jimi Hendrix. His most famous rendition was before NBA superstar Kobe Bryant's final game against the Utah Jazz, on April 13, 2016.

The Chili Peppers released their eleventh studio album, The Getaway, on June 17, 2016. The band embarked on a 151-date world tour which concluded in October 2017.

Gang of Four tribute, Unlimited Love, Return of the Dream Canteen, and Bonfire of Teenagers (2019-present)

In December 2019, the Red Hot Chili Peppers announced that guitarist John Frusciante would be returning to replace Josh Klinghoffer. The band will focus on making a new album, which they hope to have released in 2020, along with performing on a few festival dates.

Since the summer of 2020, the Chili Peppers have been working on their twelfth studio album however due to the COVID-19 pandemic, there have been delays in the writing and recording along with their 2020 tour dates being postponed until 2021.

In January 2021 it was announced that Flea and John Frusciante contributed a cover of "Not Great Men" to the upcoming tribute album to Gang of Four titled The Problem of Leisure: A Celebration of Andy Gill and Gang of Four. The double album was released on June 4, 2021.

In October 2021, the Chili Peppers announced the dates for their 2022 world tour that began in June 2022 and will conclude in July 2023. The tour includes the band's first-ever headlining stadium shows in the United States in support of their twelfth and thirteenth studio albums, Unlimited Love and Return of the Dream Canteen, which were respectively released on April 1 and October 14, 2022.

Flea along with Josh Klinghoffer and Chad Smith collaborated with Morrissey on his upcoming album Bonfire of Teenagers, which was supposed to be released in February 2023, but in December 2022 it was announced that its future is in limbo, as Capitol Records has decided not to release it.

Film and television
Flea has pursued a minor acting career since the mid-1980s. His first role was as young punk Razzle in the Penelope Spheeris film Suburbia (1984). Shortly thereafter he starred alongside the Chili Peppers, who played themselves, in the skate drama Thrashin' (1986). He played the ill-fated punker Milo in another Penelope Spheeris film, Dudes (1987). He also made an appearance in the Bruce Weber documentary film about the life and career of jazz trumpeter Chet Baker entitled Let's Get Lost (1988). He portrayed the character Douglas J. Needles in Back to the Future Part II (1989) and Back to the Future Part III (1990), though in an interview he referred to Part II as "a multi-million-dollar piece of trash", saying that he was happy neither with the film nor his performance in it.

Flea played a minor role in the 1991 independent film My Own Private Idaho as the character Budd. He played a number of minor roles in films throughout the 1990s, including Son in Law (1993) as a tattoo artist, The Chase (1994) as a monster truck driver alongside Kiedis, Fear and Loathing in Las Vegas (1998) as a "Hippie", in The Big Lebowski (1998) as a German nihilist, and the 1998 remake of Psycho. He has also lent his voice to the Nickelodeon animated series The Wild Thornberrys as the character Donnie. In 1992, Flea and the other Red Hot Chili Peppers appeared as themselves in the animated comedy The Simpsons on the episode "Krusty Gets Kancelled".

In 2011, Flea appeared in the documentary, Bob and the Monster. The film details the life of musician and drug counselor Bob Forrest.

Flea appears in the documentary The Other F Word, which aired on Showtime and was released through Oscilloscope Laboratories (a company founded by Adam Yauch). The documentary, which was directed by Andrea Blaugrund Nevins, focused on a generation of punk rockers, how they have handled fatherhood, and how they went from public rebel to domestic authority figure. Mark Hoppus, Jim Lindberg, Art Alexakis, and Mark Mothersbaugh were also featured.

Flea made his return to acting and co-starred in the 2014 film Low Down, which is based on the life of jazz pianist Joe Albany. Flea along with Anthony Kiedis executive-produced the film, which stars John Hawkes, Elle Fanning, Glenn Close, and Peter Dinklage. The film had a successful debut at the Sundance Film Festival in January 2014 and opened in limited release in October 2014. It was released in March 2015 on DVD. This marked his first acting role in 14 years. The film was directed by Jeff Preiss, who previously worked with Flea on the 1988 documentary Let's Get Lost. In 2015, he provided the voice of the "mind cop" Jake in the Pixar film Inside Out.

In 2015, Flea appeared as himself in the Amazon Prime series Highston. It was announced in 2017 that Amazon Prime had cancelled plans for a full series of the show.

Flea plays Eddie No-Nose in Edgar Wright's action feature film Baby Driver (2017). That same year he had a cameo appearance during the fifteenth season of the FOX animated television series Family Guy in an episode titled "Peter's Def Jam". In a scene where Stewie Griffin said to his dog Brian Griffin that thanks to him, there's a recurring flea problem in Stewie's room, Flea enters and drops a bass line on his guitar. He asks Brian if he wants to hang out, but Stewie kicks Flea out of the room.

Flea co-stars with Lucas Hedges, Nicole Kidman and Russell Crowe in the 2018 film Boy Erased.

On February 16, 2018, Flea took part in the 2018 NBA All-Star Celebrity Game on a team led by Canadian musician Justin Bieber.

In August 2020, Flea was featured playing bass on multiple tracks on the new Bright Eyes studio album Down in the Weeds Where the World Once Was.

On June 2, 2021, it was announced that Flea will star alongside Brad Pitt, Margot Robbie and Samara Weaving in the 2022 film, Babylon, which was directed by Damien Chazelle. This film is set in the late 1920s during the movie industry’s transition from silent films to talkies and explores the rise and fall of multiple characters. The movie has been described as “The Great Gatsby on steroids.” The movie was released on December 23, 2023.

Flea appears in the Disney+ Obi-Wan Kenobi series, aired on May 27, 2022. The series is directed by Deborah Chow who directed the 2022 music video for the Red Hot Chili Peppers single, "Black Summer".

Personal life
Flea has been married two times and has three children. From 1988 to 1990, Flea was married to Loesha Zeviar (Loesha's name remains tattooed on Flea's chest). Their daughter, Clara Balzary, was born in 1988. Clara was featured in the band's Funky Monks documentary. She also has appeared at many shows and, as a child, provided artwork for the band's T-shirts and promotional material. She has also documented the band's I'm With You tour through photographs and videos. As an adult, Clara was most recently in the short-lived band the Tints and is also an aspiring artist and photographer, taking the promotional photographs for The Getaway. In 2005, Flea was engaged to model Frankie Rayder, who was once named GQ magazine's sexiest woman in the world. The couple never married however they had a child together, Sunny Bebop Balzary, who was born on October 26, 2005. The song "Hard to Concentrate" on the Chili Peppers' 2006 album, Stadium Arcadium, was written by Kiedis as a wedding proposal to Flea and Rayder. Flea and Rayder since split up. In 2019, Flea got married for a second time when he married fashion designer Melody Ehsani. Flea said of Ehsani, "My life has changed forever and I am eternally humble and grateful. The person who sees all of me and knows who I am. My wife @melodyehsani." On July 31, 2022, Ehsani announced on her Instagram page that she was pregnant. On December 12, 2022, Ehsani gave birth to their first child together.

On October 30, 1993, Flea was playing at The Viper Room with the band P when his close friend River Phoenix was outside the venue having seizures as the result of an overdose. When this news filtered through the club, Flea rushed outside and accompanied Phoenix in the ambulance that took him to Cedars-Sinai Hospital. In August 2020, Flea appeared on two unreleased songs from Phoenix's band Aleka's Attic to mark what would have been his 50th birthday.

As an adult, Flea became a U.S. citizen. In a 2000 interview, he stated his intention to eventually retire to his native Australia. Flea appeared in the 2011 documentary The Other F Word, where he discussed the joys of being a father. "It's funny how you always hear people saying that classic parent attitude of, 'I brought you into this world, I gave you life!' You know, it's just, I think, completely the opposite. My kids gave me life. They gave me a reason."

In a June 23, 2011, interview, Flea discussed the band's return and how he almost quit the Chili Peppers during their hiatus. Flea said that he wanted to take two years away to see if the band was "something we should still be doing. . . . Things had gotten dysfunctional and not fun, even though I thought we were making great records, doing great shows and were a really powerful, mighty thing as a band. I was proud of what we did. . . . For me, the biggest thing during the time off, and what really made me want to continue doing the band, specifically after decided he didn't want to continue in the band anymore, [was] I just realized, Anthony, man, he's my brother, I love him so much, and we started this band when we were kids. I wanted to keep that going, I never want to let that go. Playing with him is something, even though I can do other things that are exciting and beautiful and I always will do those things and I'll always want to grow and do music outside of the band, the thing that we have is special to us and something that is blood."

In February 2015, Flea posted photos to his Instagram page showing that he had broken his arm during a skiing trip. His injury delayed the recording of the Chili Peppers eleventh studio album for six months with production expected to resume in mid-August according to Flea, who said on August 3, he was now healed enough to play bass again and continue recording.

In February 2018, Flea released a passionate and revealing op-ed through Time magazine about the opioid crisis as well as his own personal history of drug addiction about which for most of his career he had been very private. Flea hoped that by exposing his past issues with substance abuse that his stories could possibly help others battling their own addictions and raise more awareness on the need for those in the medical community and the government to help those in need. "I've been around substance abuse since the day I was born. All the adults in my life regularly numbed themselves to ease their troubles, and alcohol or drugs were everywhere, always. I started smoking weed when I was eleven, and then proceeded to snort, shoot, pop, smoke, drop and dragon chase my way through my teens and twenties," Flea said. Flea finally kicked his addictions in 1993; however, he revealed that in 2014 when he broke his arm in a snowboard accident he nearly had setbacks due to oxycontin that his doctor prescribed for him: "My doctor put me back together perfectly, and thanks to him I can still play bass with all my heart. But he also gave me two-month supply of Oxycontin. The bottle said to take four each day. I was high as hell when I took those things. It not only quelled my physical pain, but all my emotions as well. I only took one a day, but I was not present for my kids, my creative spirit went into decline and I became depressed. I stopped taking them after a month, but I could have easily gotten another refill. Addiction is a cruel disease, and the medical community, together with the government, should offer help to all of those who need it."

Flea is a fan of the Los Angeles Dodgers, Los Angeles Rams, and Los Angeles Lakers. He can often be spotted sitting courtside at Lakers games with some of his bandmates and has even performed the National Anthem prior to Lakers games. He is also known to be a fan of English football team Sheffield United.

Sexual assault
In 1990, Flea (Balzary) was arrested in Daytona Beach, Florida and charged with battery, disorderly conduct, and solicitation to commit an unnatural and lascivious act, and Chili Peppers drummer Chad Smith was charged with battery, after the two were accused of "attacking a woman" in the audience of one of their performances; as reported by a ranger from Volusia County,Balzary and Smith jumped into the crowd. / Balzary picked up the woman and began to spin her around on his shoulders, while Smith pulled her bathing suit to one side and began to slap her bottom... / [Unnamed officials also] said Balzary got on top of the woman, asked her to perform a sex act, then began to simulate the act.The woman "apparently was picked from the audience at random", and "[a]fter [she] cried for help, the band was escorted away." According to the same ranger, the victim "signed a complaint against the band members" (which resulted in the charges filed).

Activism and philanthropy
Flea and the Chili Peppers appeared in 1992 PSA ads for Rock the Vote, a non-profit organization created to encourage 18- to 24-year-olds in the United States to vote in the upcoming presidential election.

The Chili Peppers were invited by the Beastie Boys and the Milarepa Fund to perform at the Tibetan Freedom Concert in June 1996 in San Francisco. They also performed at the June 1998 Washington, D.C. concert as well. The concerts, which were held worldwide, were to support the cause of Tibetan independence.

In 2001, Flea co-founded the Silverlake Conservatory of Music with his childhood friend Tree. The school is dedicated to help youth progress in music. Flea said he wanted to "fill the void" created by the lack of public funding for school music departments: "I grew up in LA public schools and was in the music department. It was really an important thing for my life, it gave me something to hold onto, and it was an important access for me. Without music I would've gotten into a lot of trouble and there are a lot of kids like me out there. I just wanted to try to provide something like what I got."

In September 2005, the Chili Peppers performed "Under the Bridge" at the ReAct Now: Music & Relief benefit which was held to raise money for victims of Hurricane Katrina. Thirty million dollars was raised during the live event which was broadcast across the world on various television networks and online.

In October 2008, Flea (along with his daughter Sunny Bebop) appeared in a Vote for Change ad voicing his support for Barack Obama for president of the United States in the upcoming election.

On March 20, 2011, Flea ran the LA Marathon to raise money for the Silverlake Conservatory of Music through Crowdrise. Flea was also featured in Runner's World magazine discussing his preparation for the race.

The Chili Peppers performed a free concert in downtown Cleveland, Ohio on April 15, 2012, in support of President Barack Obama's re-election campaign.

On May 11, 2013, the Chili Peppers performed a special concert in Portland, Oregon, for the Dalai Lama as part of the Dalai Lama Environmental Summit. According to the press release, "The musical element of this event is intended to be a display of joyful celebration and an inspiration to future generations to care for our planet. The Red Hot Chili Peppers have been great supporters of the Tibetan cause, of His Holiness the Dalai Lama, and of the need to work to protect and preserve our environment."

On August 19, 2014, Flea took part in the Ice Bucket Challenge.

In May 2015, Flea reached out to fans to help donate to the Special Olympics. Two lucky fans will be selected to be flown out to meet Flea for private bass lessons. Other prizes such an exclusive T-shirts, personalized video from Flea, tickets to a Red Hot Chili Peppers concert and various autographed items by Flea are available.

Flea took to his Facebook page in anger speaking out about May 19 Santa Barbara oil spill that pumped 100,000 gallons of crude oil into the Pacific Ocean. Flea was at the beach with his young daughter when she stepped in a tar ball. Flea wrote "Dear plains all American pipeline, my daughter just dared step on the beach for a few minutes where we live about 75 miles from the Santa Barbara oil spill you caused. She got your oil shit product all over her feet." Flea stated he can no longer surf there or take his daughter to the beach further saying "Some kid in the hood who made a mistake selling drugs will go to jail and have his life ruined but you, you evil lying scumbags will get away with a paltry fine that means nothing to you. You could have had a shut off valve but you saved cash there too. You are the worst kind of human beings, I am infuriated you disgust me."

Flea has been outspoken towards guns and gun violence, sometimes speaking about it during Chili Peppers shows. He often expresses his anger on Twitter. In 2013, he said, "why anyone would ever want to own an automatic weapon I will never ever understand. it's a pathetic useless concept for sick people. Automatic, semi automatic, I don't care. I'm against em........ Melt em all down turn em into sculptures there is no need for them on earth. In many countries, the cops have no guns and they do perfectly fine. No civilians should be allowed to have guns. none. and I don't think the cops should have guns either. change the constitution". Following the racially motivated Charleston church shooting in June 2015, Flea again voiced his anger towards gun violence, saying: "You are kidding me. This is too much. Humans are an over rated species. Sick. God help us." and "The USA land where any sick madman can easily get a gun. disgusting, deplorable, unbelievable."

In August 2015, Flea added an apiary in his backyard which includes three beehives with approximately 60,000 bees each—over 200,000 bees total—in his backyard in efforts to restore the honeybee population. Flea commented on his new obsession with beekeeping by saying: "Deep to the hive super organism. I love my bees. Flea's bees."

On September 18, 2015, Flea and his Chili Peppers bandmates were among over 120 entertainers and celebrities to announce that they would be voting for Bernie Sanders in the 2016 election for President of the United States.

The Chili Peppers performed at a fundraiser on behalf the non-profit organisation San Diego Foundation on September 27, 2015. All money was donated to ARTS — A Reason To Survive, Heartbeat Music Academy, San Diego Young Artists Music Academy, and Flea's Silverlake Conservatory of Music. Flea and bandmate Anthony Kiedis host an annual benefit for the Silverlake Conservatory of Music. In October 2015, the event was limited to 300 tickets at $2,500 each. The Chili Peppers performed an acoustic set, and John Legend headlined.

Flea performed in the Pathway to Paris concert in December 2015. The all-star event aimed to raise awareness about the urgency of climate action and coincided with the UN Climate Change Conference in Paris.

In February 2016, the Chili Peppers performed at a "Feel the Bern" fundraiser in support of presidential candidate Bernie Sanders. Flea said, "Bernie Sanders is the only remotely reasonable candidate for President of the United States."

In August 2016, Flea paid a visit to see Koko the gorilla and to also raise awareness for The Gorilla Foundation. The foundation said of Flea's visit "One of Koko's favorite musicians, Flea from the Red Hot Chili Peppers came to visit. Koko was thrilled by the mellow sounds and a jamming session followed with Koko strumming on Flea's bass!"

Flea has been vocal about climate change. He stated in January 2019, "the destructive effects of climate change are ongoing and will be difficult for us human beings to deal with." Days later the Red Hot Chili Peppers performed at a benefit concert for victims of recent deadly Woolsey Fire in California which killed four people and destroyed over 1,500 homes. The fires even halted the recording for the Chili Peppers' twelfth album.

On April 26, 2020, Flea performed during The Pathway to Paris Earth Day 50: A Virtual Festival, a livestream event to celebrate the 50th anniversary of Earth Day. The festival streamed on an Instagram page.

Flea joined Brad Pitt during the COVID-19 pandemic to help contribute to a community food giveaway for the people of Watts, Los Angeles on July 31, 2020. "The community gives back to me. I like being a part of it, I like building bridges, I like making friends. When corona hit and I was sitting around and going to the beach and stuff, I did a lot of thinking about people who really might be struggling because they’re not getting enough to eat and not making money during COVID times,” Flea said.

Acid for the Children
In April 2014, Flea began writing his memoir. The original scope of the book was to chronicle Flea's unconventional childhood (including his move from a "normal" life in the New York suburbs to a "bohemian" lifestyle in Los Angeles with his jazz-playing stepfather), his adventures in the L.A. streets, his "sometimes complex friendship and collaboration" with Chili Peppers co-founder Anthony Kiedis and the overall "tumultuous creative journey" of the band, which formed in 1983.

In February 2018, it was announced that Flea's long-awaited memoir, Acid for the Children, would be released on September 25, 2018; however, a few months later the release date was pushed back to November 27, 2018. On September 27, 2018, Flea announced on Twitter that his book has been postponed until 2019 saying "Dear everybody, Due to some scheduling conflicts, the release of my memoir has been delayed until next year. Will have a date as soon as possible. Sorry about any inconveniences.sincerely, flea.

Flea also confirmed that unlike previously mentioned four years earlier, the book would focus exclusively on his life before the Red Hot Chili Peppers. "It's my great hope that it could be a book that could live beyond being a celebrity book or a rock star book and just stand on its own as a piece of literature," Flea says of Acid for the Children, which he describes not as a memoir, but as an origin story: "It ends where the Red Hot Chili Peppers begins."

Instruments and sound

Bass guitars
Flea has employed a wide variety of basses over his career with some varying exclusivity, such as Music Man, Modulus, his own brand Fleabass, and Fender Jazz and Precisions.

Currently, his main stage bass is a Custom Shop Fender Jazz Bass, modified with a Modulus Lane Poor pickup and Aguilar OBP-1 preamp, identical to the Modulus basses he previously used. Fender has released this bass for sale as the Flea Signature Active Jazz Bass (no longer in production as of 2020), in addition to a signature instrument modeled after his 1961 Fender Jazz Bass (which has been his primary studio bass since 2006); Flea treasures his 1961 Jazz Bass for its "old wood sound".

According to the Flea Bass Rig (Part 1) video he used the following over the years in order of appearance.
 Music Man Cutlass 1 (No longer in production)
 Fender Precision Bass (In black seen live in 1989)
 Spector NS-2 with 2 jazz pickups (Seen in "Fight Like A Brave")
 Spector NS-2 (Seen in "Taste The Pain")
 Teisco Del Ray NB-4 (Used in the video for "Higher Ground", not used to record)
 Wal Mk 2 (Seen in "Suck My Kiss")
 Music Man Stingray 4 (Seen in "Aeroplane")
 Music Man Stingray 5 string (Seen in "Under The Bridge")
 Alembic Epic 4 (Seen in "My Friends")
 Modulus signature basses (see below)
 1961 Fender Jazz Bass (Pre CBS)
 Fleabass (Flea's own brand of bass from his business that was active from 2009-2011)

Signature Modulus Flea Bass
Flea toured the Californication, 2001, By The Way, Roll on the Red, Stadium Arcadium, and I'm With You, and 2013-2014 tours with his signature Modulus Flea basses (Later renamed Modulus Funk Unlimited after the endorsement). Available in 4- and 5-string versions, Flea was seen with several designs over this time.
 Blue Sparkle
 Silver Sparkle
 Red, White, and Blue (with punk band stickers overlayed on the body)
 Aboriginal pattern (in Drop D tuning for By the Way)
 Australian Aboriginal Flag (in E♭ tuning for Breaking the Girl)
 Black (originally in Sunburst, as seen in the photo above)

Fleabass (Multi-Coloured Deluxe Spin Bass Guitars)
In 2009, Flea founded the Fleabass company with the goal to create quality budget basses for beginners. Whilst Flea did not perform with his own Fleabass production model he did however use a custom model created by UK artist Damien Hirst.
Damien actually made me a bass, a butterfly bass, it's a beautiful thing. It's not just a piece of art to hang on a wall. The whole new album I play on it. This bass is kind of heavy for live—I don't play Fenders that much live—but it's beautiful. 
The custom Fleabass was built with Lane Poor active pickups, Graphite neck, and 18-volt Aguliar OBP-1 preamp. It can be seen in the music videos for The Getaway album.

Fifty of these basses were created. They were auctioned for Flea's Silverlake Conservatory of Music, with a list price of £50,000.

Fender Custom Shop
In The Getaway and 2022 Global Stadium tours, Flea uses four Custom Shop Fender Jazz basses. 
 Silver Jazz (Sticker of the Helmets on the body)
 Road-worn pink Jazz (in E♭ tuning for Black Summer)
 Lakers Jazz (Purple with Lakers decal on the body; in Drop D tuning for By the Way)
 Brown Jazz (with a "SUPPORT YOUR LOCAL FREAK" sticker on the body)

These basses have a Jazz Bass style body, Lane Poor Legacy pickup, 18-volt Aguilar OBP-1 preamp, and a 22-fret graphite-reinforced neck created by Fender Custom Shop master builder Jason Smith. The Silver Jazz is Fleas' current main tour bass, replacing his Modulus basses in the process.

Other basses
According to thekingofgear.com, Flea uses the following basses in the Atoms for Peace concerts aside from his 1961 Jazz.:
Fender Precision (Sunburst)
Hofner 500/1

Effects
Throughout his career, Flea uses these effects units:
BOSS ODB-3 Bass Overdrive
MXR Micro Amp M133
Electro-Harmonix Q-Tron
Dunlop 105Q Cry Baby Bass Wah
Malekko B:assmaster
Moog Moogerfooger  MF-103 12-Stage Phaser
Electro-Harmonix Big Muff π
DOD FX25 Envelope Filter
Boss GEB-7 Bass Equalizer
Wilson Effects Freaker Wah
Radial Engineering SGI-44
Radial Engineering JX44

Amplifiers and cabinets
According to the Flea Bass Rig (Part 2) video he used the following amps and cabs over the years in order of appearance.

1983-1989
Trace Elliot AH500X
Trace Elliot 4x10
Ampeg VB4
Ampeg SVT-810E
Peavey 8x10 (unconfirmed)

1989-1995
Mesa/Boogie Buster Bass 200
Mesa/Boogie D210
Mesa/Boogie D215
Gallien-Krueger 800RB

1995-2011
Gallien-Krueger 2001RB
Gallien-Krueger 410 RBH
Gallien-Krueger 115 RBH

2011 (I'm with You World Tour)
Acoustic USA 360
Acoustic USA 361

2012-present
In 2012, Flea, an endorser of Gallien Krueger amps and cabs, reverted the use of the 1995-2011 configuration. However, in the recording of Unlimited Love and Return of the Dream Canteen (recorded on the same sessions as Unlimited Love), he used the following amps:
Ampeg Portaflex
Roland JC-120

In the 2022 Global Stadium Tour, Flea used Ampeg SVTs.

Musical style
Flea has displayed a wide variety of techniques throughout the years, ranging from his initial use of slapping and popping to the more traditional methods he has employed since Blood Sugar Sex Magik. Greg Prato of Allmusic wrote that "by combining funk-style bass with psychedelic, punk, and hard rock, Flea created an original playing style that has been copied numerous times". Flea stated in an interview, that he was influenced greatly by Louis Armstrong. Flea has been considered one of the greatest bassists of all time, with Greg Tate of Rolling Stone saying "if there were a Most Valuable Bass Player award given out in rock, Flea could have laid claim to that bitch ten years running". Smashing Pumpkins front man Billy Corgan recalls, that when he first saw the Chili Peppers in 1984, "Flea was playing so aggressively that he had worn a hole in his thumb and he was literally screaming in pain in-between songs because it hurt so bad. Someone kept coming out and pouring crazy glue into the hole." Flea's sound is also determined by what type of instrument he plays. Before Californication, he did not believe the actual bass held much significance: "what mattered was how you hit them [basses] and your emotional intent, and I still think that's the bottom line."

Technique

Flea's bass playing has changed considerably throughout the years. When he joined Fear, his technique centered largely on punk rock bass lines; however, he was to change this style when the Red Hot Chili Peppers formed. He began to incorporate a "slap" bass style that drew influence largely from Bootsy Collins. However, this technique caused Flea to receive attention from the music world and was often copied, and he, therefore, felt it necessary to almost completely remove slap-bass styles from his repertoire following Mother's Milk (1989). Consequently, Blood Sugar Sex Magik (1991) saw a notable shift in style as it featured less of his signature technique and more styles that focused on traditional and melodic roots. His intellectual beliefs on how to play the instrument were also altered: "I was trying to play simply on Blood Sugar Sex Magik because I had been playing too much prior to that, so I thought, 'I've really got to chill out and play half as many notes'. When you play less, it's more exciting—there's more room for everything. If I do play something busy, it stands out, instead of the bass being a constant onslaught of notes. Space is good."

During the writing and recording of One Hot Minute (1995), Flea integrated some use of slap-bass progressions, but continued to apply the philosophy of "less is more" to his technique rather than courting complexity: "I can't even think of anything I played that was complex [on the record]; even the slapping stuff is simple. It's original-sounding, and I'm proud of that—but what I played was more a matter of aesthetic choice." This led Flea to alter the way he wrote music by playing alone, instead of the jam sessions that would dictate how the band conceived songs: "[One Hot Minute] is the least jam-oriented record we've made. I mean, we definitely jammed on the ideas, but there's only one groove on the whole album that came from a jam, 'Deep Kick'. The rest of it came from my sitting down with a guitar or bass."

Flea became interested in electronica during the Californication (1999) era and he attempted to emulate the same atmosphere given off by synthesizers into his bass playing: "I feel the most exciting music happening is electronica, without a doubt." He ultimately decided against this, acknowledging that, aside from Frusciante, the band was not moving in the same direction.

In By the Way (2002), many of the bass-lines were entirely stripped of funk. Flea felt the chords Frusciante had written were not supportive of his typical technique; furthermore, he does not feel the musical direction of the record was specifically melodic, but instead "... a result of each one of us being who we are. The way we [the band] compose music is a very communal thing."

Influences
Flea's stepfather was in a bebop jazz band that frequently jammed in his presence, so he soon became fascinated with the trumpet. Flea credits his continued interest in music to jazz performers like Jaco Pastorius, Miles Davis, Duke Ellington, Charlie Parker, Louis Armstrong, John Coltrane, and Dizzy Gillespie. After Kiedis introduced him to punk and rock, Flea became infatuated with artists such as Black Flag, David Bowie, and Defunkt. Flea's early influences before Blood Sugar Sex Magik were mainly funk artists. They would become a notable aspect of the Red Hot Chili Peppers' sound up to Mother's Milk. Originally, Flea was given the impression by punk bands, that one should play as hard and fast as they possibly could, but ultimately rejected this philosophy during Blood Sugar Sex Magik: "I was so into being raw [...] it was all bullshit." On Californication and By the Way, Flea drew influence from electronica, gothic rock bands like the Cure, Joy Division and Siouxsie and the Banshees and new wave music rather than funk. Flea has also spoken highly of Neil Young; he wrote an article for Rolling Stone praising Young for the consistent authenticity in his artistry, among other things.

Recognition and legacy
Regarded as one of the best rock bass players of all time, in 2009, Rolling Stones readers ranked Flea the second-best bassist in their top-ten poll, ranked behind only John Entwistle of the Who and ahead of Paul McCartney of the Beatles. In a 2010 poll conducted on the BBC Two series I'm in a Rock 'n' Roll Band!, Flea was named the bassist in the ultimate fantasy band alongside Freddie Mercury on vocals, Jimi Hendrix on guitar and John Bonham on drums.

In April 2011, Flea finished second in an online poll conducted by Contact Music to name the best bass guitarist in rock music. He came second to the late John Entwistle. Rounding out the top five were Paul McCartney, Geddy Lee of Rush and Les Claypool of Primus.

Filmography

Film

Television

Video games

Non-Red Hot Chili Peppers music videos

Discography

Red Hot Chili Peppers

Atoms for Peace
Amok (2013 album)

Solo
 "I've Been Down", released in the soundtrack for the movie The Basketball Diaries
 "Media Blitz", released on the compilation, Germs Tribute
Helen Burns (2012 EP)

Collaborations
 "#1 da Woman" by Tricky
 "Baby Can't Drive" by Slash with Alice Cooper, Nicole Scherzinger and Steven Adler
 "Barcelona" by Jewel
 "Bleed for Something Beautiful" by Mina Caputo
 "Bust a Move" by Young MC
 De-Loused in the Comatorium by the Mars Volta (selected tracks)
 The Empyrean by John Frusciante
 "Note to a Friend" by Aleka's Attic
 Concert Series Volume 1 by Axis of Justice (selected tracks)
 "Freeway" by Porno for Pyros with Dave Navarro
 "Gimme Shelter" by Patti Smith
 "Hardcharger" by Porno for Pyros with Dave Navarro
 "Hard Life Easy" by Satellite Party
 Wednesday: Modern Folk and Blues by Bob Forrest (2006)
 "Heart of Gold" by Johnny Cash with John Frusciante and Chad Smith
 "Hell Broke Luce" by Tom Waits
 "I Come Off" by Young MC
 "I Make My Own Rules" by LL Cool J with Dave Navarro
 "Idiots Rule" by Jane's Addiction with Angelo Moore and Christopher Dowd
 "Ill Wind" by Michael Brook with James Pinker Pinkerelly, Jimmy Scott, and Michael Stipe
 "It's A Rockin World" by Joe Strummer with Tom Morello, Benmont Tench, DJ Bonebrake, and Nick Hexum
 "Leave My Monkey Alone" by Warren Zevon
 "Kettle Whistle" by Jane's Addiction
 "Miranda that Ghost Just Isn't Holy Anymore" by the Mars Volta
 Momentum by Joshua Redman
 "Narcissus" by Alanis Morissette
 "The Odyssey" by Incubus
 "Raised Right Men" by Tom Waits
 Rocketjuice and the Moon by Rocket Juice & the Moon
 "Sleepin' wit My Fonk" by Sir Mix-A-Lot
 "So What!" by Jane's Addiction
 "Spiritual" by Johnny Cash with Curt Bisquera
 "War" by Bone Thugs-n-Harmony with Henry Rollins and Tom Morello
 "The Widow" by the Mars Volta
 "What'll I Do (Remix)" by Janet Jackson (remixed by Flea, Chad Smith & Dave Navarro)
 "White Rabbit" by Patti Smith with Tom Verlaine
 "You Oughta Know" by Alanis Morissette with Dave Navarro
 "Grease the System" by Banyan with John Frusciante
Antemasque by Antemasque
Was Never There by Pluralone
Nowhere I Am by Pluralone
 "Not Great Men" with John Frusciante
 Bonfire of Teenagers - Morrissey

Producer
The Boldness Of Style EP by Thelonious Monster (produced the song "Walk On Water")

Notes

References

External links

 
 

1962 births
Living people
Alternative rock bass guitarists
American alternative rock musicians
American experimental musicians
American male film actors
American male television actors
American male voice actors
American people of Australian descent
American people of Hungarian descent
American people of Irish descent
Antemasque (band) members
Atoms for Peace (band) members
Australian alternative rock musicians
Australian expatriate male actors in the United States
Australian experimental musicians
Australian male film actors
Australian male television actors
Australian male voice actors
Australian people of Hungarian descent
Australian people of Irish descent
Fairfax High School (Los Angeles) alumni
Fear (band) members
Grammy Award winners
Jane's Addiction members
Musicians from Melbourne
People with acquired American citizenship
People with chronic fatigue syndrome
Pigface members
Red Hot Chili Peppers members
The Mars Volta members
What Is This? members
Australian autobiographers
American autobiographers
20th-century American male actors
21st-century American male actors
21st-century American musicians
20th-century American bass guitarists
21st-century American bass guitarists
20th-century Australian male actors
21st-century Australian male actors
20th-century Australian musicians
21st-century Australian musicians
21st-century multi-instrumentalists